The following are the national records in athletics in the Republic of the Congo maintained by the Congo's national athletics federation: Fédération Congolaise d'Athlétisme (FCA).

Outdoor

Key to tables:

+ = en route to a longer distance

h = hand timing

OT = oversized track (> 200m in circumference)

Men

Women

Indoor

Men

Women

Notes

References
General
World Athletics Statistic Handbook 2019: National Outdoor Records
World Athletics Statistic Handbook 2018: National Indoor Records
Specific

External links

Congo
Records
Athletics
Athletics